Franko Mičić (born 29 October 1940) is a Croatian-Australian former soccer player. Mičić played the majority of his senior career in the Victorian State League for Footscray J.U.S.T. with short stints with South Melbourne Hellas and St Kilda Hakoah. He played a single season with J.U.S.T. in the National Soccer League (NSL). He played in six international matches for the Australia national soccer team.

Early life
Mičić was born in Zadar, Yugoslavia, modern-day Croatia. As a teenager, his family left to migrate to the United States. Mičić only made it as far as Italy where he played local football. At the age of 19, he migrated from Italy to Australia.

Playing career

Club career
On arriving in Australia, Mičić joined J.U.S.T. making his debut in the Victorian State League in 1959 after two reserve grade appearances.

Mičić joined South Melbourne ahead of the 1968 season, with the Hellas paying  for his services. He returned to J.U.S.T. for the 1969 season.

After playing in Footscray J.U.S.T.'s first season in the National Soccer League, Mičić transferred to St Kilda Hakoah for the 1978 Victorian State League season as a playing coach. Mičić was replaced as Hakoah coach in mid-1979.

State career
He played 55 games for the state team of Victoria, captaining the team for six years.

International career
Mičić played six full international matches for Australia, scoring once.

Honours
Footscray J.U.S.T.
Victorian State League Champion: 1963, 1969, 1971, 1973
Dockerty Cup: 1963, 1976
Ampol Cup: 1960, 1966, 1975
State League Cup: 1974, 1975, 1976

Individual
Bill Fleming Medal: 1964, 1967, 1973
Football Victoria Hall of Fame: 2022

Notes

References

1940 births
Living people
Australian soccer players
Australia international soccer players
National Soccer League (Australia) players
Association football midfielders